Provence School is a private Catholic primary and secondary school, located in Marseille, France. The school was founded by the Society of Jesus in 1873. The school enrols approximately 2,000 students and is organized under a statute of association of 1901 law and contract of association with the State.

High school ranking 
In 2015, the high school ranked 17th out of 77 in their department in terms of teaching quality, and 443rd at the national level.

See also

 Catholic Church in France
 Education in France
 List of Jesuit schools

References  

Jesuit secondary schools in France
Jesuit elementary and primary schools in France
Educational institutions established in 1873
1873 establishments in France
Schools in Marseille